This is a list of members of the Australian Senate from 1971 to 1974. Half of its members were elected at the 25 November 1967 half Senate election and had terms due to finish on 30 June 1974; the other half were elected at the 21 November 1970 half Senate election and had terms due to finish on 30 June 1977. In fact, the term for all of them was terminated by the double dissolution for the 18 May 1974 election.

The government changed during the Senate term as the election cycles of the Senate and the House of Representatives had been out of synchronisation since 1963 and the Coalition government, led by Prime Minister William McMahon, was defeated by the Labor Party, led by Gough Whitlam, at the December 1972 House of Representatives election.

Members

Notes

References

Bibliography

Members of Australian parliaments by term
20th-century Australian politicians
Australian Senate lists